The Marriage Bond may refer to:

 The Marriage Bond, an American play by Rida Johnson Young 
 The Marriage Bond (1916 film), an American film adaptation
 The Marriage Bond (1932 film), a British film directed by Maurice Elvey